Root Division is an American arts nonprofit 501(c)(3) organization founded in 2002, and located in the Mid-Market/South of Market neighborhood of San Francisco, California. 

They offer a gallery space, exhibition opportunities for emerging and mid-career artists, art classes, artist residencies, and art studio space.

About 
The Root Division is located in a building at 1131 Mission Street at 7th Street in Mid-Market, and offer a gallery space for rotating exhibitions. Many of their exhibitions are led by independent and emerging curators, as well as hosting art fundraisers and auctions. Art classes hosted are for both adults and youth. It has 22 artists’ studios, occupied by some 28 artists (some studios are shared). The Root Division artist residencies last for up to 2 years.

The Root Division's Executive Director is Michelle Mansour, since 2007.

History 
The organization was founded in 2002, by three graduates of San Francisco Art Institute. It operated out of the 3175 17th Street building in the Mission District, a 7,000-square-foot space owned by the nonprofit Seven Teepees. 

Due to gentrification and a steep rise in rent, Root Division had to leave the building in 2015. They were awarded funds from the city and county of San Francisco's Nonprofit Displacement Mitigation Fund, as well as fund raised for the expenses of moving and remodeling to their new location at 1131 Mission Street in the Mid-Market/South of Market neighborhood. The new location is a 13,000-square-foot building, almost doubling their space.

Notable associated people

References

External links 
 Official website

Art museums and galleries in San Francisco
Arts organizations based in the San Francisco Bay Area
Culture of San Francisco
501(c)(3) organizations
Arts organizations established in 2002
Art in San Francisco
2002 establishments in California
Non-profit organizations based in California